Jalan Damansara is a major road in Kuala Lumpur, Malaysia. One of the oldest roads in the city, it currently serves as a link between the Damansara sections of Petaling Jaya and Kuala Lumpur (from Bandar Sri Damansara through to the Petaling Jaya suburbs of Bandar Utama and Damansara Utama and then to the heart of Kuala Lumpur through its suburbs of Taman Tun Dr. Ismail and Bukit Damansara).

Name

Jalan Damansara was named after a small harbour-like settlement, which no longer exists, that was located near the mouth of the Damansara River along the Klang River. The harbour was known as Labuhan Sara – Labuhan means a place for ships to anchor, while sara can be taken to mean "departure" or "embarkation" (related to the word bersara meaning retirement). The name Damansara may have been originally Indian; in Hindustani, daman means "foothills" while sara may mean either "a mansion of wealth", or "water" in Sanskrit.

History

Origin

Damansara Village was a popular place for ships to anchor for those who used the Klang River as a means of travel between the port town of Klang and the mining settlement of Kuala Lumpur. Although many boats can go up to the junction of Gombak River and Klang River in Kuala Lumpur, the steam boats used by the British to cut the travel time between Klang and Kuala Lumpur could only travel up to Damansara. In order to reach Kuala Lumpur, travellers would then need to traverse overland via a track, established in 1873, connecting Damansara and Kuala Lumpur through the jungles and hills of the Damansara (including the area currently known as Damansara Heights). Around the mid-1870s, after steam boats were introduced, construction began on an unmetalled road between the harbour of Damansara to Brickfields and Kuala Lumpur. This road would become known as Damansara Road. The road was 15.5 miles long, and Brickfields at the end of the road then become known as Batu Limabelas meaning "15th mile". By 1878, 12 miles of the earth road had been completed, with the remaining 3.5 miles built by Yap Ah Loy.

In 1880, the state capital of Selangor was moved to Kuala Lumpur. Following this, In 1895, the existing Damansara Road was extended to link the suburb of Brickfields (then the only exit and entry point into KL) and the city centre of Kuala Lumpur. The roads currently known today as Jalan Raja (facing the Sultan Abdul Samad Building) and Jalan Sultan Hishamuddin was known as a stretch of road called the Gombak Road, named after its crossing over the Gombak River. The extension included the Jalan Sultan Hishamuddin stretch of the then Gombak Road and Cenotaph Road (today known as Jalan Tugu), ending at a wooden bridge crossing the Klang River at Market Street (today known as Leboh Pasar Besar). This linked the then Damansara Road to Brickfields Road (known today as Jalan Travers), which ran to Brickfields.

Damansara Road today
Not much remains of the original Damansara Road today. It eventually became a pioneer road of the Damansara–Puchong Expressway and the Damansara Link of the Sprint Expressway. Because sections of the road parts of these highways, Jalan Damansara currently exists in fragments at several locations. The intervening sections of the original road now link with stretches of the road that form these highways at different locations:

 Near Bukit Lanjan where it continues alongside the Damansara–Puchong Expressway (through the Kota Damansara sections) and then merges completely with the highway until it diverges into its original course through the Kuala Lumpur suburb of Taman Tun.
 In the suburbs of Taman Tun where Jalan Damansara exists as a short residential road cordoned off from the rest of the existing road, off Jalan Burhanuddin Helmi.
 Near Taman Tun where it merges with the Sprint Highway this time through the Damansara area of Petaling Jaya and Kuala Lumpur. It then diverges from the highway (near the Semantan interchange at Pusat Bandar Damansara) through Bukit Damansara where it connects with the MRR1 and then ends at Jalan Sultan Hishamuddin (near the Kuala Lumpur railway station)

List of interchange/junctions

References

Highways in Malaysia
Expressways and highways in the Klang Valley
Roads in Kuala Lumpur